Munsö is a village and a former island (the latter is also known as Munsön) in Ekerö Municipality, Stockholm County in Sweden. Because of post-glacial rebound, this island in Lake Mälaren is now connected to the island Ekerön.

The village has a 12th-century round church.

References

Populated places in Ekerö Municipality
Uppland
Islands of Mälaren
Viking Age populated places
Burial sites of the House of Munsö